"Sisters of Avalon" is a single from the 1997 album of the same name, by American singer Cyndi Lauper. This single was only released in Japan. A sampler was released as a promo only CD in the United States.

Song information

The song is about sisterhood and it shows the power of women Lauper wanted to show through the song and the album as a whole. As a result of the song, Lauper wanted to work with female writers and producers during a lot of the making of the album.

A video was shot for the song when it was released. Of the video, Lauper said:

"This one has a little bit of a story in it too because it's kind of the rites of passage of women. It has women symbols. I wanted to show the force of nature and the energy of the song. It's really wonderful. It's like you're making paintings and when you're the artist, as opposed to when I direct someone else, it's like performance art. I can't think of any other job I could have where I can enjoy the process of making these little films."

Track listing

Japan CD Single
 "Sisters of Avalon" (single edit) - 3:46
 "Sisters of Avalon" (album version) - 4:21
 "Unhook the Stars" (album version) - 3:58

Official versions
Album version
Single edit – 3:46
Extended version

References

Cyndi Lauper songs
Songs written by Cyndi Lauper
1997 songs
Songs written by Jan Pulsford